Japana  may refer to:
 Japana, Georgia, a town in the country of Georgia
 Japana-rhythm, an album by Bennie K
 Chelonomorpha japana, a moth species in the genus Chelonomorpha
 Cicindela japana, a beetle species in the genus Cicindela
 a vernacular name for Ayapana triplinervis, a tropical American shrub